Friedrich Wilhelm Hidding (6 November 1926 – 2 August 2011) was a German field hockey player who competed in the 1952 Summer Olympics. He was born in Hamm.

References

External links
 

1926 births
2011 deaths
German male field hockey players
Olympic field hockey players of Germany
Field hockey players at the 1952 Summer Olympics
Sportspeople from Hamm
20th-century German people